Andaz London Liverpool Street is a 5 star hotel in central London, situated immediately south of Liverpool Street station, originally built as the Great Eastern Hotel in 1884. The building underwent extensive renovation and expansion between 1899 and 1901 and again in 2000, when it was co-owned by Terence Conran. Hyatt has owned the hotel since 2006, operating it under the Andaz brand.

The hotel has been listed Grade II on the National Heritage List for England since March 1993.

History 
The Victorian building that houses the hotel is built on the site of England's first hospital for the mentally ill, the Bethlehem Royal Hospital, which opened in 1247 and became known as 'Bedlam'. The hotel was designed by the brothers Charles Barry, Jr. and Edward Middleton Barry. It was built by Lucas Brothers and completed in 1884.

An additional section, the Abercorn Rooms, was added a decade later by Robert William Edis. The hotel's clientele included business people who could avoid City traffic by staying near the railway station. By 1908 the hotel was operating as the Liverpool Street Hotel and produced postcards advertising its proximity to the London Underground. A daily supply of fresh sea water for bathing was brought in by train. The building is notable also for its inclusion of two Masonic Temples—an Egyptian temple in the basement and a Grecian temple on the first floor. Caledonian Lodge No 134, an English lodge for Scottish Masons in London, met at the Great Eastern from 1920 to 1947.

By the second half of the twentieth century the hotel was due for refurbishment and, following the redesign and improvement of the railway station in the 1980s, it was expected that an investor would be found to accomplish a similar task with the adjacent hotel. The Manser Practice, which had already achieved success with the planning and construction of a Hilton Hotels & Resorts brand hotel on the south side of London Heathrow Airport, was awarded the refurbishment contract in 1996. A new lobby was created by removing several existing guest rooms, and the capacity was increased to 267 rooms by reusing attic space. The Manser design was informed by the practice of daylighting, realised by providing lightwells in the ceiling of the lobby and in the main dining room and by providing as many views of London as possible in the bedrooms.

Since 2006 the hotel has been owned by Hyatt, which operates it as Andaz London Liverpool Street, a 5 star lifestyle hotel.

Facilities 
The building, including the Abercorn Rooms, is of red brick with stucco and stone ground floor and mildly classical style dressings. Of the 267 rooms, 15 are suites. Seven bars and restaurants are available on the property, as well as a fitness centre and steam room.

In literature 
The Great Eastern is where vampire hunter Abraham Van Helsing stays during his first visit to London in Bram Stoker's Gothic fiction horror novel Dracula. The narrator of W. G. Sebald's Austerlitz meets the titular character in the bar of the Great Eastern after a twenty-year separation; Austerlitz recounts details of the building including the Grecian temple.

References 
Notes

Bibliography

External links 
 

Hotels established in 1884
Hotels in London
Charles Barry Jr. buildings
1884 establishments in England
Grade II listed buildings in the City of London
Grade II listed hotels